Lynn C. Pasquerella is an American academic and the 14th president of the American Association of Colleges and Universities. Before she assumed this position, she was the 18th president of Mount Holyoke College in South Hadley, Massachusetts, serving from 2010 to 2016. She was a professor of philosophy at the University of Rhode Island for 19 years before becoming URI's Associate Dean of the Graduate School. From 2006 to 2008 she was vice provost for research and dean of the graduate school at the University of Rhode Island. She was the Provost of the University of Hartford from 2008-10. She also currently serves as the President of the Phi Beta Kappa Society.

Education
Pasquerella is a 1980 Phi Beta Kappa, magna cum laude graduate of Mount Holyoke College and earned her Ph.D. in Philosophy in 1985 from Brown University.

Career
Pasquerella is a philosopher whose area of interest is medical ethics. She was a fellow in the John Hazen White Sr. Center for Ethics and Public Service and a professor of medical ethics in Alpert Medical School’s Affinity Group Program.

Pasquerella has received funding through the United States Department of Energy to work on ethical issues related to the Human Genome Project. She has also received research grants from the National Endowment for the Humanities, the National Science Foundation, the William and Flora Hewlett Foundation, the American Bar Association, the Council of Graduate Schools, and the United States Office of Research Integrity. She was the principal investigator on a $3.5 million NSF ADVANCE grant to promote the careers of women in the science, technology, engineering and mathematics (STEM) disciplines and on a $750,000 NSF–Northeast Alliance for Graduate Education and the Professoriate grant to encourage recruitment of underrepresented groups into the professoriate in STEM fields.

Pasquerella has served on the boards of Paul Newman's Discovery Center and the Africa Center for Engineering Social Solutions, for which she has also been a  project leader in Kenya. She has served on the board of directors of the Rectory School, Day Kimball Hospital’s ethics committee and as chair of its Institutional Review Board, the Rhode Island Bio Bank Steering Committee, the Rhode Island Health Department’s Institutional Review Board, and the advisory board for the Women’s Adult Correctional Facility in Rhode Island.

Since July 2010, Pasquerella has hosted The Academic Minute, a radio segment and podcast featuring a different university-based researcher each day. The Academic Minute is produced by Northeast Public Radio with support from Newman's Own Foundation in partnership with Mount Holyoke College. In addition to Northeast Public Radio, The Academic Minute is heard on approximately 30 additional stations across the United States and Canada.

On January 4, 2016, Pasquerella announced that she would be stepping down as president of Mount Holyoke College at the end of the 2016 academic year. Pasquerella became the 14th president of the American Association of Colleges and Universities starting July 1, 2016. In 2018, Pasquerella became the president of the Phi Beta Kappa Society. Since 2017, she has served on the Newman's Own Foundation Advisory Board and on the Lingnan Foundation Board of Trustees. She is also a member of the Editorial Advisory Board for Public Philosophy Journal.

Awards and recognition 
In May 2019, Pasquerella was named one of America’s Top 35 Women in Higher Education by Diverse: Issues in Higher Education.

Pasquerella has received the 2018 Algernon Sydney Sullivan Award for Distinguished Humanitarian Service and Altruism from Mary Baldwin College. On May 20, 2017, Pasquerella was the commencement speaker for Elizabethtown College's Class of 2017. On June 3, 2017, she received an honorary doctorate in Civil Law from Bishop's University in Quebec, Canada. Pasquerella delivered a commencement address and received an honorary doctorate degree at the University of Hartford’s graduate commencement ceremony on May 18, 2019. She also received honorary doctorate degrees during the commencement ceremonies of the University of South Florida on May 2, 2019, and the University of Rhode Island on May 19.

Publications
Ethical Issues in Home Health Care. Co–authored with Rosalind Ladd and Sheri Smith. Charles C. Thomas Publishing, 2002.
Ethical Dilemmas in Public Administration. Edited with Alfred Killilea and Michael Vocino. Praeger, 1996.
"Brentano’s Theory of Value: Beauty, Goodness, and the Concept of Correct Emotions" with Wilhelm Baumgartner in The Cambridge Companion to Brentano, 2004. Pages 220–237.

References

External links
Official Website

Quinebaug Valley Community College alumni
Mount Holyoke College alumni
Brown University alumni
University of Hartford faculty
Brown University faculty
Mount Holyoke College faculty
University of Rhode Island faculty
Presidents and Principals of Mount Holyoke College
Living people
1958 births
Women heads of universities and colleges
American women writers
American women academics
21st-century American women